Ichneutica nullifera is a moth of the family Noctuidae. This species is endemic to New Zealand and can be found in the Tongariro National Park, along the Wellington coast and throughout the South Island. The adults are large and the forewing of adults can vary in colour from pale fawn to dark grey. The larvae are coloured a bright yellow-brown with a paler underside. The larval host species are in the genus Aciphylla and as a result the adult moths are often found in habitat dominated by species in this genus. Adults are on the wing from November to early April and are sometimes attracted to light.

Taxonomy
This species was first described by Francis Walker in 1857 using a specimen collected in Waikouaiti by Mr P. Earl. The holotype specimen is held at the Natural History Museum, London. In 1988 J. S. Dugdale placed this species within the Graphania genus. In 2019 Robert Hoare undertook a major review of New Zealand Noctuidae. During this review the genus Ichneutica was greatly expanded and the genus Graphania was subsumed into that genus as a synonym. As a result of this review, this species is now known as Ichneutica nullifera.

Description

Walker described the male adult of this species as follows:
 
Hudson in his 1928 book The butterflies and moths of New Zealand described the larva of this species as follows:

I. nullifera is large in size with the male of the species having a wingspan of 53 to 67 mm and the female having a wingspan of between 57 and 77 mm. The forewing colouration of specimens can vary from deep fawn to a dark grey. Of this species near relatives, I. nobilia is the most similar in appearance, but can be distinguished as a result of the deep greyish-blue sheen on that species' forewings.

Distribution
It is endemic to New Zealand. I. nullifera can be found in the Tongariro National Park, along the Wellington coast, and throughout the South Island.

Habitat 
This species tends to prefer a habitat where its host species flourish.

Behaviour 
The adults of this species is sometimes attracted to light. The adults are on the wing from November to early April.

Life history and host species 

The larvae of this species feeds on Aciphylla species including Aciphylla aurea, Aciphylla colensoi, Aciphylla glaucescens, Aciphylla squarrosa, Aciphylla subflabellata. The larvae prefers the softer centre of the plant and its presence can be detected by the frass it produces as well as the discolouration it causes by feeding near the base of the leaves. The larvae are often found in burrows in the stem of the host plant. The pupa, which is in a loose cocoon, can be found in the leaf litter near the roots of the host plant.

References

Moths described in 1857
Hadeninae
Moths of New Zealand
Endemic fauna of New Zealand
Taxa named by Francis Walker (entomologist)
Endemic moths of New Zealand